Vallabhipur(a) may refer to the following entities in western India :

 Vala State, a former princely state in Eastern Kathiawara (Gujarat)
 its capital Vala, modern Val(l)abhi